North Carolina Highway 615 (NC 615) is a primary state highway in the U.S. state of North Carolina.  It connects Knotts Island with mainland North Carolina via the Currituck–Knotts Island Ferry.

Route description
NC 615 connects the community of Knotts Island with both mainland North Carolina and Virginia.  The  route begins at NC 168, in Currituck, where it goes east and crosses over the Currituck Sound, via the Currituck-Knotts Island Ferry.  On Knotts Island, it continues north for  before reaching the Virginia state line. On the island, the route is well signed and borders the Mackay Island National Wildlife Refuge.

Ferry service, which predates the highway by one year (1962), was established originally to shorten the travel time for Knott's Island school children to their school on the mainland (in Barco).  The ferry is free with year-round service with travel times of 45 minutes on average.

The highway is the northeasternmost primary route in the state. The entire route is concurrent with North Carolina Bicycle Route 4.

History
Established around 1963 as a new primary routing, NC 615 was located only on Knotts Island. At some point before 2001, the highway was extended overlapping the Currituck-Knotts Island Ferry, ending on the mainland at Courthouse Road. Justification for the extension was to connect to North Carolina Highway 168 and remove a gap.

Major intersections

References

External links

NCRoads.com: N.C. 615

615
Transportation in Currituck County, North Carolina